is a former Japanese football player. He currently manager of FC Ryukyu from 2023.

Playing career
Kuranuki was born in Otsu on November 10, 1978. After graduating from Shizuoka Gakuen High School, he joined J1 League club Júbilo Iwata in 1997. However, he did not play in any official games for the club in which many Japan national team players played. In 2000, he moved to a J2 League club, Ventforet Kofu. He became a regular player as offensive midfielder from first season. The club finished in last place for two years in a row (2000-2001). After that, the club finished around the middle of the J2 League from 2002 to 2004. In 2005, the club improved and finished in 3rd place, earning a promotion to the J1 League for the 2006 season. 

Kuranuki was injured in April 2006 with an anterior cruciate ligament injury in the left knee, and he could not play until December. In 2007, Kuranuki moved to J2 club Kyoto Sanga FC. He played as a regular player in 2007, and the club was promoted to J1 from 2008. However, the club gained many players and Kuranuki did not play regularly. 

In June 2008, Kuranuki moved to J2 club Tokushima Vortis. He played as regular player until the 2011 season. In 2012, Kuranuki moved to Kyoto Sanga FC again and played in two seasons. In 2014, Kuranuki moved to J3 League club Gainare Tottori. He played as regular player and retired at the end of the 2014 season.

Managerial career
In 28 October 2022, Kuranuki appointed manager of relegated J3 club, FC Ryukyu from 2023 season.

Club statistics

Managerial statistics
.

References

External links

1978 births
Living people
Association football people from Shiga Prefecture
Japanese footballers
J1 League players
J2 League players
J3 League players
Júbilo Iwata players
Ventforet Kofu players
Kyoto Sanga FC players
Tokushima Vortis players
Gainare Tottori players
Association football midfielders
J2 League managers
FC Ryukyu managers